C-Media Electronics, Inc. is a Taiwan computer hardware company that manufactures  processors for PC audio and USB storage, and wireless audio devices. Many of their PCI audio solutions can be found in the Xonar sound cards developed by ASUS.

Products

ISA audio 
 CMI8328
 CMI8330

PCI audio 
 CMI8338
 CMI8738-SX
 CMI8738-LX
 CMI8738-MX
 CMI8768
 CMI8768+ (Dolby Digital Live encoding)
 CMI8769
 CMI8770 (Dolby Digital Live & DTS Connect encoding)
 Oxygen HD CMI8786
 Oxygen HD CMI8787

 Oxygen HD CMI8788 (Dolby Digital Live & DTS Connect encoding)

AC'97 audio 
 CMI9738
 CMI9739
 CMI9761
 CMI9780

HD Audio 
 CMI9880 (some of them have Dolby Digital Live certification)
 CM8888 (Oxygen Express-series) APPLICATIONS : PowerColor Devil HDX Sound Card
 CMI8828 (Oxygen Express-series) APPLICATIONS : HT OMEGA FENIX Sound Card, SUNWEIT ST15, SUNWEIT ST16
 CM8826 (Oxygen Express-series)

USB audio 
 CM102A+/S+
 CM108AH
 CM108B
 CM118B
 CM119B/BN
 CM6206
 CM6206-LX
 CM6300
 CM6302
 CM6317A
 CM6327A
 CM6400
 CM6400X1
 CM6500B
 CM6502B
 CM6510B
 CM6523B
 CM6530N
 CM6531N
 CM6533(N)
 CM6533DH
 CM6533X1
 CM6535
 HS-100B

Wi-Sonic network audio 
 CMWS-01: Uses CMI8769 for audio.
 WS-011
 WS-012
 WS-021
 WS-022
 WS-101

USB storage 
 CM120 (Support for this product does not exist in C-Media.tw)
 CM220
 CM220F
 CM220L
 CM220S
 CM320
 CM320L
 CM320S

Sensaura licence expiry 
C-Media's Sensaura licence expired on 23 September 2008. While there is an article promoting new Xear3D EX with OpenAL support, replacement drivers are not available at the current time.

As of 26 September 2011, drivers are now available for some PCI chipset models.
 CMI 8738
 CMI 8768
 CMI 8768+
 CMI 8770
 CMI 8787
 CMI 8788

See also 
 List of sound card manufacturers
 List of Taiwanese companies
 AC'97
 Sound card

References

External links 
 Official forum
 Drivers
 Open Source Windows driver 8738/8768

Manufacturing companies based in Taipei
Electronics companies established in 1991
Audio equipment manufacturers of Taiwan
Sound cards
Taiwanese brands
Taiwanese companies established in 1991